Choi Soo-young (born February 10, 1990), professionally known as Sooyoung, is a South Korean singer, actress and songwriter. She was a member of the short-lived Korean-Japanese singing duo Route 0 during 2002 in Japan. After returning to South Korea in 2004, Sooyoung eventually became a member of girl group Girls' Generation in 2007, which went on to become one of the best-selling artists in South Korea and one of South Korea's most popular girl groups worldwide. Apart from her group's activities, Sooyoung has also starred in various television dramas such as The Third Hospital (2012), Dating Agency: Cyrano (2013), My Spring Days (2014), Squad 38 (2016), Man in the Kitchen (2017–2018), Tell Me What You Saw (2020), and most recently in Run On (2021), So I Married the Anti-fan (2021), and If You Wish Upon Me (2022).

In October 2017, Sooyoung left SM Entertainment although she remains as a member of Girls' Generation. She joined Echo Global Group and released her first solo single "Winter Breath" in 2018, before moving to Saram Entertainment in 2019.

Life and career

1990–2007: Early life and career beginnings
Sooyoung was born in Gwangju, Gyeonggi, South Korea, on February 10, 1990. She is the younger sister of Choi Soo-jin, who is a musical theatre actress. Sooyoung was initially discovered through an SM Entertainment Open Audition when she was in fifth grade. She later won first place at the 2002 Korea-Japan Ultra Idol Duo Audition and debuted in Japan as a member of Route 0. The duo released three singles before disbanding in 2003.

Sooyoung returned to SM Entertainment and eventually debuted in South Korea as a member of the girl group Girls' Generation in August 2007. The group gained significant popularity with the release of their hit single "Gee" in 2009.  Sooyoung has said in an interview that she was also interested in acting before debuting as a singer and had failed more than 70 auditions during her pre-debut days.

2008–2016: Acting roles and lyrics writing

Aside from Girls' Generation's activities, Sooyoung has participated in various music and acting projects. In the early days, her acting work mostly involved several small roles and guest appearances—these include KBS2's sitcom Unstoppable Marriage (2007), romantic comedy film Hello, Schoolgirl (2008), SBS's drama Oh! My Lady (2010), SBS's Paradise Ranch (2011) and SBS's A Gentleman's Dignity (2012). During this period, musically, she recorded two songs—one trot song titled "KKok" with Girls' Generation member Yuri for the SBS' drama Working Mom, while the other one, "Feeling Only You", was a collaboration with Girls' Generation member Tiffany and South Korean duo The Blue.

Throughout her career, besides contributing her vocal to Girls' Generation's songs, Sooyoung has explored into lyrics writing. She penned the lyrics for three songs: "How Great is Your Love" (2011), "What Do I Do" (2016), and "Sailing (0805)" (2016), while co-writing the song "Baby Maybe" (2013).
In September 2012, she landed her first major acting role in tvN's medical drama The Third Hospital. She was praised by both co-actors Oh Ji Ho and Kim Seung-woo and the viewers were drawn to her emotional scene due to her natural display of emotion. In May 2013, Sooyoung was cast in tvN's romantic comedy drama, Dating Agency: Cyrano. It was a spin-off of the 2010 movie Cyrano Agency. She played a dating expert who works at a dating agency helping people to find their love. Park Ju-yeon from the Hankook Ilbo praised Sooyoung for her lively character portrayal and said that there was not any "overdone emotions commonly appear in acting newcomers".

In September 2014, Sooyoung scored a lead role in MBC's melodrama, My Spring Days. Her character is a terminally ill patient who gets a heart transplant; and meets her donor's husband, played by Kam Woo-sung. This was a breakthrough performance for Sooyoung as she won the "Best Actress in a Miniseries" award at the 2014 MBC Drama Awards and the "Excellence Award for Actress" at the 2015 Korea Drama Awards. She contributed a song to its soundtrack, titled "Wind Flower". In 2015, Sooyoung starred as the female lead in KBS2's special drama Perfect Sense, which was produced by Samsung Fire & Marine Insurance to help raise public understanding of the disabled. She played a teacher named Ah-yeon who is visually impaired. In June 2016, Sooyoung starred as the female lead alongside Ma Dong-seok and Seo In-guk in the OCN crime drama Squad 38.

2017–present: Label change and continued acting 
In early August 2017, Sooyoung starred as television producer in the JTBC web drama Someone You Might Know. Later in August, she played the female lead in the MBC drama series Man in the Kitchen. In November 2017, Sooyoung joined Echo Global Group after her contract with SM Entertainment ended. With a change of label, her future activities with Girls' Generation remain in discussion.

In 2018, Sooyoung was cast in the Korean-Japanese film Memories of a Dead End and the action comedy film Girl Cops.

In December 2018, Sooyoung released her solo single, "Winter Breath", which is her first song to be released since her departure from SM Entertainment, with the song's music video made available online on the same day. Sooyoung launched her official Twitter and YouTube accounts to commemorate the single's release.

In May 2019, Sooyoung signed with new agency Saram Entertainment. In February 2020, Sooyoung starred in the OCN drama Tell Me What You Saw.

In 2020, Sooyoung starred in JTBC romance drama Run On. Then in 2021, she starred alongside Choi Tae-joon in the Naver TV romantic comedy series So I Married the Anti-fan, based on the manhwa of the same name and appeared in the Netflix original series Move to Heaven.

In 2022, she starred in the KBS2 drama If You Wish Upon Me in the role of a nurse at hospice. Sooyoung participated in Girls' Generation's fifteenth anniversary album Forever 1 (2022), with her co-writing the song "Seventeen" for the album.

Personal life
Sooyoung graduated from JeongShin Women's High School in 2009.  She went on to major in film studies and graduated from Chung-Ang University in February 2016, receiving a lifetime achievement award at the graduation ceremony.  Her fellow Girls' Generation member Kwon Yuri attended the same university.

Sooyoung has been dating Jung Kyung-ho since 2013.

Philanthropy

Sooyoung has engaged in various philanthropic activities. In 2012, she was appointed as ambassador to Korea's Retinitis Pigmentosa Society along with her bandmates Tiffany, Taeyeon and Seohyun. At the end of that year, she launched a fundraising campaign with cable channel QTV for patients of the disease. Since then, she has continued to serve as ambassador while conducting sponsorship events and supporting the research on treatment of patients.

In 2016, Sooyoung launched a clothing brand called Beaming Effect with the aim to raise awareness for Retinitis Pigmentosa. She has held several charity bazaars throughout the years and donated the proceeds towards research for treatment of the disease. Notably, she held a funding with Kakao, a charity bazaar and a charity concert featuring various artists in 2017.

Sooyoung has also been appointed ambassador to the Korean Day of Overcoming Rare Diseases, the Social Welfare Council and the National Disability Awareness Improvement Campaign. In 2014, she sponsored the operation cost of a person with heart disease after playing the role of someone who received a heart transplant through organ donation in her drama My Spring Days.

Discography

Singles

Filmography

Film

Television series

Web series

Television shows

Web shows

Events

Ambassadorship 
 Ambassador for sharing (2022)

Awards and nominations

References

External links

 
 
 

1990 births
Living people
People from Gwangju, Gyeonggi
People from Gyeonggi Province
Girls' Generation members
Japanese-language singers of South Korea
South Korean female idols
South Korean women pop singers
South Korean expatriates in Japan
South Korean film actresses
South Korean television actresses
South Korean television presenters
South Korean women television presenters
Chung-Ang University alumni
English-language singers from South Korea
SM Entertainment artists
Mandarin-language singers of South Korea
21st-century South Korean actresses
Soo-young